Ad de Boer (born 1946 in The Hague) is a Dutch politician and journalist.

See also
List of Dutch politicians

References

1946 births
Living people
Christian Union (Netherlands) politicians
21st-century Dutch politicians
Dutch corporate directors
Journalists from The Hague
Municipal councillors in Gelderland
People from Nijkerk
Protestant Church Christians from the Netherlands
Reformatory Political Federation politicians